"What Do You Want from Me?" is the debut single by New Order bassist Peter Hook's band Monaco. The song is about Hook's failed relationship with comedian Caroline Aherne. Released in February 1997 from the band's debut album, Music for Pleasure (1997), the song peaked at number 11 on the UK Singles Chart and became a top-30 rock hit in both Canada and the United States. The band released two further singles from the album, but this remains the most successful. A music video was also shot for the song. The track was adopted by fans of Shelbourne F.C. in 2011.

Critical reception
British magazine Music Week rated the song four out of five, adding, "Sounding like New Order with smiling faces, this first offering from Peter Hook and guitarist David Potts' partnership is a bright pop affair with those unmistakable Hook bass lines." David Sinclair from The Times described it as "a song blatantly redolent of New Order, yet charmingly so."

Music video
The music video for the song features group members Peter Hook and David Potts entering a fancy casino along with many other glamorous people, including two women who appear to be with the both of them, plus two gothic-looking characters (male and female), a dwarf, and a glamorous-looking woman. As Potts plays roulette with a group of people, Hook plays his bass and sings beneath the glass table. Just before the chorus, Hook appears outside and Potts assists in singing the chorus from underneath the glass. Later on, two back-up singers also appear underneath the glass. At another table, a dealer hands Hook some cards. He sneaks a peek at them as he sings. When he wins, the dwarf, along with many other people, appear at the table. The dwarf jumps up and down, cheering. The band then appear in a white room performing the song and also at what appears to be the front of the casino. The guests continue to enjoy themselves and the glamorous looking woman who entered with the dwarf throws something away in the trash. The dwarf appears in another part of the casino playing the featured piano solo while the gothic-looking man sits with the gothic-looking woman. He gestures to her as if to say he needs to be excused and goes off with the glamorous-looking woman as his former date looks on. Later on, a man grabs a woman's behind and she shoos him away while the back-up singers sing in to a microphone in another part of the casino. A woman kisses the dwarf on the head and another man has a drink poured on him by a woman as the band continues to play in the white room. At the end, the four women featured in the video leave the hotel smiling and Hook and Potts follow them out.

Track listings
 UK and Australian CD single (573 191-2)
 "What Do You Want from Me?"
 "Bicycle Thief"
 "Ultra"
 "What Do You Want from Me?" (instrumental)

 UK 7-inch and cassette single (573 190-7; 573 190-4)
 "What Do You Want from Me?"
 "Bicycle Thief"

Charts

Weekly charts

Year-end charts

Release history

References

1997 songs
1997 debut singles
Monaco (band) songs
Polydor Records singles
Songs written by Peter Hook